Pinus heldreichii (synonym P. leucodermis; family Pinaceae), the Bosnian pine or Heldreich’s pine, is a species of pine native to mountainous areas of the Balkans and southern Italy.

Description

It is a member of the hard pine group, Pinus subgenus Pinus, with leaves ('needles') in fascicles (bundles) of two, with a persistent sheath.

Longevity 
A tree in Northern Greece was dated as 1,075 years old in 2016.

What is believed to be the oldest known living tree in Europe has been discovered in a remote mountainous area of the Pollino National Park in southern Italy. It is a Heldreich’s pine estimated at 1,230 years. Much of its core has turned to dust, but there is enough new growth to confirm it is still alive.

Nomenclature 
The species was first described as Pinus heldreichii by the Swiss botanist K. Hermann Christ in honor of Theodor von Heldreich in 1863 from specimens collected on Mount Olympus, and then described a second time as P. leucodermis in 1864; the author of the second description (the Austrian botanist F. Antoine who found it on Orjen above the Bay of Kotor in Montenegro) being unaware of the slightly earlier publication by Christ. Some minor morphological differences have been claimed between the two descriptions (leading to the maintenance of both as separate taxa by a few botanists), but this is not supported by modern studies of the species, which show that both names refer to the same taxon. The discrepancies in the descriptions are largely due to Christ's cone specimens being immature and shrunken after drying, having been collected in July, four months before maturity.

Distribution 
It can be found in the mountains of Bosnia and Herzegovina, Montenegro, Croatia, southwestern Bulgaria, Albania, North Macedonia, Kosova, northern Greece (Valia Kalda, Smolikas and Vasilitsa, Mount Olympus and in other high mountains), and locally in southern Italy (it is the symbol of the Pollino National Park), growing at  altitude. It reaches the alpine tree line in these areas.

Cultivation and uses
Bosnian pine is a popular ornamental tree in parks and large gardens, giving reliable, steady, though not fast, growth on a wide range of sites, and with a very neat, conical crown. It is also noted for its very decorative purple cones. The cultivars ‘Smidtii’ and ‘Compact Gem’ have been given the Royal Horticultural Society's Award of Garden Merit. It is hardy down to at least , and tolerant of severe wind exposure. Many in cultivation are still grown under the name Pinus leucodermis or Pinus heldreichii var. leucodermis.

P. heldreichii is able to adapt to extreme environmental conditions and is also a great colonizer. It is resistant to sulphur dioxide, hydrogen fluoride, nitrogen dioxide and ozone pollution and is further able to withstand wind, ice and heavy snow. These abilities makes it suitable for reforestation of extensive dry and high-altitude areas. In the south of Italy it is planted because it is less susceptible to pests than other pine species.

Gallery

References

Literature
Simone Morris (2017) Pini Loricati nella nebbia | 
Simone Morris (2018) Loricati in the fog |

External links

 Pinus heldreichii - information, genetic conservation units and related resources. European Forest Genetic Resources Programme (EUFORGEN)

Flora of Bosnia and Herzegovina
Flora of Bulgaria
Flora of Italy
Flora of Europe
Heldreichii
Flora of Montenegro
Orjen
Taxa named by Konrad H. Christ